Etsako West is a Local Government Area of Edo State, Nigeria. Its headquarters are in the town of Auchi. Etsako West is made up of six clans: Uzairue, Auchi, South Ibie, Anwain, Jagbe and Aviele.

The major towns in this LGA includes Auchi, Jattu, Agbede, Ughiole, Odighie, Egho, Ubiane, Iyamho, Iyuku, Ayogwiri, Apana, Iyora, Afowa, Afashio, Ikabigbo, Irekpai, Ogbido, Ayaoghena, Ikholo, Uluoke, Ugbhenor, Idato, Ayua, Imeke, Elele, Sabo Iyakpi, Ibienafe, Ughieda, Iyerekhu, Egbogio, Jagbe clan (Ikhwa, Imiokono, Inhianmhen, Imogian) and Awain clan {Ewora, Idegun, Ama, Ibhioba}.

The Agbedes were originally the makers of the artifacts that are seen in Benin. There was a threatened elimination of the Agbedes in Benin, which led to the evacuation of the Agbede people from the Benin Kingdom.

History
The first king of Agbede is — Oba Momodu the 1st of Agbede, who was not educated, but was assumed or endowed with the knowledge of various Languages who was also the first Muslim King in the area now known as Edo State, could speak many languages even though he had no schooling in these tongues. It is said that he began to pray and act like a Muslim, years before he came across Nupe and Hausa Mallams in his community, Ayuele Country of Agbede.

Oba Momodu the 1st who ruled from 1890-1912 was unique in many ways, so say the accounts. He was the Oba of Agbede in Edo State, and could speak countless languages. But he was never taught any of these tongues, some of which were European languages. This has both puzzled and impressed many people over the years.

Geography
It has an area of 946 km and a population of 197,609 at the 2006 census.

It also has the Prestigious Federal Polytechnic attended by students all over the state.

The postal code of the area is 312.

References

Local Government Areas in Edo State